William Ecker was a naval officer.

William Ecker may also refer to:

William J. Ecker, rear admiral in the United States Coast Guard
William Ecker (assemblyman) in 50th New York State Legislature